Voloshino is a rural locality (a selo) in Ostrogozhsk, Ostrogozhsky District, Voronezh Oblast, Russia. The population was 582 as of 2010. There are 7 streets.

Geography 
Voloshino is located 12 km west of Ostrogozhsk (the district's administrative centre) by road. Gubarevka is the nearest rural locality.

References 

Rural localities in Ostrogozhsky District